The 16579 / 80 Yesvantpur - Shimoga Town Intercity Express is an Express train belonging to Indian Railways South Western Railway zone that runs between  and Shimoga Town in India.

Coaches
The 16579 / 80 Yesvantpur - Shimoga Town Intercity Express has one AC chair car, five Chair car, 14 general unreserved, two SLR (seating with luggage rake) & also a Vistadome coach . It does not carry a pantry car coach.

As is customary with most train services in India, coach composition may be amended at the discretion of Indian Railways depending on demand.

Service

Routing
The 16579 / 80 Yesvantpur - Shimoga Town Intercity Express runs from  via  to Shimoga Town.

Traction
As the route is going to electrification, a  based WDP-4 diesel locomotive pulls the train to its destination.

References

External links
16579 Intercity Express at India Rail Info
16580 Intercity Express at India Rail Info

Intercity Express (Indian Railways) trains
Rail transport in Karnataka
Transport in Bangalore